The Corral Canyon is a valley of the Santa Monica Mountains that slopes down to the striking and diverse terrain of the Malibu coast.

Corral Canyon State Park protects the southern portion of the valley and is managed and operated by the Mountains Recreation and Conservation Authority in partnership with the Santa Monica Mountains Conservancy. A loop trail climbs the slope of the valley within the park and loops back to the start. The trail starts at a small parking area on Pacific Coast Highway that runs along a narrow coastal terrace.

References

Canyons and gorges of California
Valleys of Los Angeles County, California
Malibu, California
Valleys of California
Santa Monica Mountains